The Alec Baldwin Show is an American talk show hosted by actor Alec Baldwin that premiered on March 4, 2018, on ABC. The series is Baldwin's second talk show following 2013's Up Late with Alec Baldwin on MSNBC and the first prime-time personality talk show to air on a major broadcast network since NBC's The Jay Leno Show ended its run in 2010.

Premise
Similar in format to the Tom Snyder talk show Tomorrow, The Alec Baldwin Show is set to "include two interviews per show, sans audience, letting them collectively stretch the entire hour, save commercial breaks. Like his podcast, which has featured lengthy conversations with everyone from Barbra Streisand to Anthony Weiner." The show "will line up actors, comedians, politicians and other newsmakers in the American pop culture sphere as guests."

Production

Development

On February 27, 2018, it was announced that ABC had given a series order to Sundays with Alec Baldwin, a new talk show television series created and presented by Alec Baldwin. The series order was reportedly for a first season of nine episodes. The pilot episode aired after the 90th Academy Awards as a "sneak peek" on March 4, 2018. Production companies involved in the series include Baldwin's company El Dorado Pictures.

In an interview with The Hollywood Reporters Lacey Rose, Baldwin went on to elaborate on his reasons for committing to the program. He explained how the limited number of episodes allowed for greater freedom and discretion when it comes to selecting guests. He specified the type of guests they were looking for saying, "The idea of doing a TV show was never really that attractive to me—because when we do the show for radio, it's one kind of reality. The minute you put a camera on people, they change...Why don't we try it and see if we get people who are more camera-ready? I wouldn't mind interviewing Jennifer Lawrence or somebody if we could find an angle that was different or fresh." 

Notable personalities that Baldwin mentioned as possible guests included Stephen King, Al Pacino, Robert De Niro, Jack Nicholson, Dustin Hoffman, and Bruce Springsteen.

Marketing
On March 2, 2018, ABC released the first clips and photographs from the series.

Cancellation
On May 15, 2018, it was announced that the series, now retitled The Alec Baldwin Show, would officially premiere in the fall of 2018 and air on Sundays at 10 PM 

On October 9, 2018, it was announced that the first formal episode of the series was scheduled to premiere on October 14, 2018, and that Robert De Niro and Taraji P. Henson would serve as guests. Subsequent guests were expected to include Kim Kardashian, Robert F. Kennedy Jr., RuPaul, Kerry Washington, Cecile Richards, Jeff Bridges, Sarah Jessica Parker, Chris Christie, Mike Myers, Regina King, Gloria Allred, Ricky Gervais, and Erna Solberg. 

On November 6, 2018, it was announced that ABC was moving the series from Sunday nights at 10 PM to a new time slot on Saturdays at 10 PM. The show was expected to return in its new time slot on December 8, 2018. 

On January 4, 2019, it was reported that ABC was pulling the show from its schedule and replacing it with reruns of other shows beginning the following night.

Episodes

Pilot

Season 1 (2018–19)

Reception
The series has been met with a negative response from critics upon its premiere. On the review aggregation website Rotten Tomatoes, the series holds a 0% approval rating, with an average rating of 3.72 out of 10 based on 7 reviews.

Upon airing, the pilot episode was met with a mixed response from critics. Metacritic, which uses a weighted average, assigned Sundays with Alec Baldwin a score of 47 out of 100 based on five critics, indicating "mixed or average reviews". 

In a positive review, Verne Gay of Newsday offered the pilot praise giving it two and a half stars out of four, commenting on its potential, saying, "Baldwin is the sort of star—either actor, talk show host, POTUS, whatever—who elicits passion. Some people love him, others not so much. There's no middle ground and never has been, and into this no man's land he steps, along with future guests. Nobody's neutral about him, and their neutrality will be tested as much as his. The show's potential will rise or fall in those edgy encounters when they come, and they certainly should. That passion could ultimately be Sundays chief asset." 

In a more negative critique, Kelly Lawler of USA Today said of the pilot, "Baldwin, who had a short-lived talk show on MSNBC in 2013, is a decent interviewer, but the talk never gets too deep or reveals new insights about his subjects" and that he "tries his level best, but the show is too slight to really click. It just might not be his Sunday."

References

External links

English-language television shows
2010s American variety television series
American television talk shows
2018 American television series debuts
2018 American television series endings
American Broadcasting Company original programming
Television series by ABC Studios